Erich Borchmeyer (23 January 1905 – 17 August 2000) was a German athlete, who competed mainly in the 100 metres.

Borchmeyer was born in Münster. He competed for Germany in the 1932 Summer Olympics held in Los Angeles, United States in the 4 x 100 metres relay, where he won the silver medal with his teammates Helmut Körnig, Friedrich Hendrix and Arthur Jonath. He also returned for the 1936 Summer Olympics held in Berlin, Germany, where he was the sole returnee of the 1932 team and teamed up with Wilhelm Leichum, Erwin Gillmeister and Gerd Hornberger to win a bronze medal.

Borchmeyer committed suicide at age 95 in a retirement home in Bielefeld.

Competition record

External links

References 

1905 births
2000 suicides
Athletes (track and field) at the 1932 Summer Olympics
Athletes (track and field) at the 1936 Summer Olympics
German male sprinters
Olympic athletes of Germany
Olympic bronze medalists for Germany
Olympic silver medalists for Germany
Sportspeople from Münster
European Athletics Championships medalists
Medalists at the 1936 Summer Olympics
Medalists at the 1932 Summer Olympics
Olympic silver medalists in athletics (track and field)
Olympic bronze medalists in athletics (track and field)
Suicides in Germany